Recording since 1966, first as a lead singer for the group People! and then as a solo artist, Larry Norman is noted for his extensive career as well his attention to Christian subject matter.  His music was released on both mainstream and independent labels, including his own Solid Rock Records.  During his career his work appeared on over 100 albums, concert bootlegs, and compilations.

People! discography

Studio albums

Live albums

Compilation albums

Solo discography

Studio albums

Live albums

Compilation albums

Fan club releases

Singles

Various artists albums

Remix albums

Young Lions discography

Studio albums

Compilation albums

The Larry Norman Bootleg Collection
From May 2011 Solid Rock released official Larry Norman Bootleg Collection albums as free downloads for members of the Solid Rock Army.

2011
 001 Royal Albert Hall, London, 1973 (recorded January 6, 1973)
 002 Kansas City, Missouri, 1978
 003 Wellington, New Zealand, 1977
 004 Oslo, Norway, 1977 
 005 Swansea, Wales, 1975
 006 Wichita, Kansas, 1976 (recorded May 30, 1976)
 007 The Wirral, England, 1991 (recorded January 5, 1991)

2012
 008 Kamperland, 1980
 009 BBC TELEVISION - CLIFF RICHARD'S ROCK GOSPEL SHOW, 1984 - hosted by Sheila Walsh, featuring duets with Cliff Richard and the London Community Gospel Choir. Broadcast Easter Sunday, April 7, 1985.
 010 Tomfest, Skamania, Washington, 1997
 011 Memphis, Tennessee, 2001 "Beyond Graceland's Gates")
 012 Skien, Norway, 1998
 013 Rotterdam, Holland, 1982? 1983? 1984?
 014 Vlaardingen, Holland 1985
 015 Portland Coliseum 1992
 016 Wiley Hall, Minnesota 1981

Selected contributions
 Born Twice, Randy Stonehill, 1971 debut album, including singing Norman compositions, vocals, produced by Norman
 Welcome To Paradise, Randy Stonehill, 1977, Vocals, Produced and Arranged by Larry Norman.
 Lead Me Home, Dave Mattson, 1978, Vocals.
 The Sky Is Falling, Randy Stonehill, 1979, Vocals, Produced and Arranged by Larry Norman.
 Appalachian Melody, Mark Heard, 1979, Vocals, Produced and Arranged by Larry Norman.
 I Remember, Little Bobby Emmons and the Crosstones, 1979, producer and co-wrote two songs. 
 Stop the Dominoes, Mark Heard, 1981, Vocals.
 Victims of the Age, Mark Heard, 1982, Vocals.
 Songs From The Earth, Lyrix, 1982, producer
 Wondergroove - Hi-Fi Demonstration Disc, 1994 Albino Brothers album (Charly Norman and "Merchants of Venice" band),  with two bonus tracks with Larry Norman singing: Down To The Water, and I Want It All.
 Q-Stone, eponymous debut album. Norman sang back-up harmonies, co-wrote several songs,  and performed a duet ("Sweet Dreams") with lead singer Mikko Kuustonen
 Caught in Time, 2000 album by Lisa Weyerhaeuser, producer, co-wrote and duet on "Closest Friend", background vocals on other songs
 "Hound of Heaven", on When Worlds Collide: A Tribute to Daniel Amos, 2000.
  Sang backup vocals and played harp on a song on Kevin Max's Stereotype B album, 2001
 Edge of the World, Randy Stonehill, 2002, Guest Vocalist on "We Were All So Young".
 Decade, a 2006 compilation of Randy Stonehill's compositions arranged and produced by Larry Norman, including unreleased bonus tracks
 Early Morning Hours, Sarah Brendel, 2008, Guest Vocalist.
 "Ya Gotta Be Saved", The Crosstones, 2010, duet with Bobby Emmons.
 Thriftstore Masterpiece Presents Lee Hazlewood's Trouble Is A Lonesome Town, Thrisftstore Masterpiece, 2013, Vocals on "Ugly Brown" and "Trouble is a Lonesome Town".

List of songs recorded by Larry Norman

The following is a sortable table of all songs by Larry Norman:

The column Song list the song title.
The column Writer(s) lists who wrote the song.
The column Original Release lists the original album or single the recording first appeared on.
The column Year lists the year in which the song was released.

References

External links
 Solid Rock Album Discography
 Larry Norman Releases

See also

Discographies of American artists
Pop music discographies
Rock music discographies
Discography